This is a list of all lighthouses in the U.S. state of Delaware as identified by the United States Coast Guard. The first lighthouse in the state was erected in 1769 and the last in 1925 (ignoring automated towers erected later); the oldest active light is the Fenwick Island Light.

If not otherwise noted, focal height and coordinates are taken from the United States Coast Guard Light List, while location and dates of activation, automation, and deactivation are taken from the United States Coast Guard Historical information site for lighthouses.

References

Delaware
 
Lighthouses
Lighthouses